The 5-kilometer team competition of the 2014 European Aquatics Championships was held on 16 August. The time trial format was used, teams started at 1-minute intervals from each other and raced against the clock.

Results
The race was started at 10:00.

References

2014 European Aquatics Championships
European Aquatics Championships